Microchromis zebroides is a species of cichlid endemic to Lake Malawi where it is only known to occur around Likoma Island where it prefers shallow, rocky areas. This species can reach a length of  TL. This species can also be found in the aquarium trade where it is known as the Mini-zebra.

References

Fish of Lake Malawi
Fish of Malawi
Haplochromini
Fish described in 1975
Taxobox binomials not recognized by IUCN
Taxonomy articles created by Polbot